Lars Lindén (born 1945) is a Swedish Christian democratic politician, member of the Riksdag from 2002 to 2009.

References

1945 births
Living people
Members of the Riksdag 2002–2006
Members of the Riksdag 2006–2010
Members of the Riksdag from the Christian Democrats (Sweden)
Place of birth missing (living people)